Ukraine competed at the 2005 Summer Universiade in İzmir, Turkey, from 11 to 22 August 2005. Ukrainian athletes did not compete in football, volleyball, and water polo.

Medal summary

Medal by sports

Medalists

See also
 Ukraine at the 2005 Winter Universiade

References

Nations at the 2005 Summer Universiade
2005 in Ukrainian sport
2005